The following non-avian fauna have been observed on and around Heard Island and the adjacent McDonald Islands, which are part of the same Australian territory.  For the list of birds, see List of birds of Heard and McDonald Islands.

Included on this list are seven species of mammal, 23 taxa of fish, 25 species of terrestrial arthropods, one land snail, one flowering plant, and one species of kelp.

Mammals

Fish

Terrestrial arthropods

Terrestrial mollusk

Flowering plant

Marine algae

See also
Antarctic realm
Fauna of Heard Island and McDonald Islands

References

 Anon. (2005). 'Heard Island and McDonald Islands Marine Reserve Management Plan'. Australian Antarctic Division.

External links
 Heard Island Nature: the Animals

 
Heard
Heard Island